Ruben Juco Villote (19 December 1932 – 6 July 2013), sometimes known as "Father Ben", was a Filipino Roman Catholic priest. He was born in Tondo, Manila on 19 December 1932. He studied philosophy and theology at San Jose Major Seminary (1951–1959) and was ordained priest for the Archdiocese of Manila in 1959.

He served as chaplain at Parish of the Holy Sacrifice, University of the Philippines Diliman. He helped build the Dambanang Kawayan (Saint John the Baptist Parish) in Taguig City and served as its pastor from 1969 to 1976. He left to found the Center for Migrant Youth in Quezon City. He authored a dozen books, was a columnist for the Pilipino Star and a regular contributor to the Sunday Inquirer Magazine.

Villote received many awards, including the AY Foundation's Mother Teresa Award in 2007 and the Aurora Aragon Quezon Peace Award in 1993. He joined the new Diocese of Cubao in 2003.

Death
Villote died on 6 July 2013 at the age of 80.

References

1932 births
2013 deaths
21st-century Filipino Roman Catholic priests
Filipino writers
Filipino journalists
Place of death missing
People from Tondo, Manila
Writers from Metro Manila
The Philippine Star people
Philippine Daily Inquirer people
Burials at the Manila North Cemetery
20th-century Filipino Roman Catholic priests